The 1996–97 Villanova Wildcats men's basketball team represented Villanova University in the 1996–97 season. With an overall record 24–10 and conference record of 12–6, the Wildcats placed first in the Big East Conference, and after reaching the finals of the Big East tournament, the team was invited to the NCAA tournament as a 3 seed.

Roster

Schedule and results

|-
!colspan=12 style=| Regular season

|-
!colspan=9 style="text-align: center; background:#"|Big East tournament

|-
!colspan=12 style=| NCAA tournament

Rankings

Team players in the 1997 NBA draft

References 

Villanova
Villanova Wildcats men's basketball seasons
Villanova
Villanova
Villanova